Small Press Distribution (SPD) is a non-profit literary arts organization located in Berkeley, California.  As their name indicates, the core of their mission is to act as an umbrella distributor and marketer for hundreds of smaller literary publishers.  SPD's primary mission is to get the books of their publishers out to bookstores, libraries, book wholesalers, and directly to readers and writers.

History
SPD was founded in 1969 by Peter Howard of Serendipity Books and Jack Shoemaker of Sand Dollar Press. The fledgling organization provided small-scale distribution services for only five publishers.  Initially called Serendipity Books Distribution, it was renamed Small Press Distribution by the late 1970s. Throughout the 1970s and 1980s, the organization periodically assembled the new titles of their publishers into printed catalogs, thus providing a vital link to underground literature for writers and readers around the US.  

By 1980, SPD was distributing the books of about 40 small publishers; by 1990, the number had grown to 330.  Today, SPD distributes books for approximately 400 publishers, each of whom produces anywhere from one to twenty books a year.

SPD became an official 501c3 non-profit in 1996.  Since that time, its sales and staff have grown despite the demise of many independent bookstores that previously operated as its most consistent customer base.  

Given the nature of commercial publishing and for-profit book distribution, a case can be made that SPD has played a vital role in keeping grassroots, noncommercial poetry and fiction continuously available in the U.S. to new generations of readers over the last three decades.

Publishers
Some publishers distributed by SPD include the following:

 Belladonna Series
 Burning Deck Press
 City Lights Publishers
 Fence Books
 Futurepoem Books
 Harbor Mountain Press
 PANK Books
 Ugly Duckling Presse

Controversy 
In December 2020, SPD was under fire after a former employee posted an anonymous article on Medium with allegations of wage theft and discrimination based on race and gender, leading to an open letter calling for the resignation of executive director Brent Cunningham. In March 2021, the organization announced the pending departure of Brent Cunningham after internal investigations commissioned by the board of directors. The board of directors have not publicly responded to the allegations of wage theft.

See also
List of book distributors

References

External links
Small Press Distribution official website
Publishers Weekly Feature Story, December 20, 1999

Publishing companies of the United States
Non-profit organizations based in California
Publishing companies established in 1969
Companies based in Berkeley, California
Book distributors
1969 establishments in California